Wallendorfer Porzellan or Wallendorf Porcelain is a porcelain manufacturing company which has been in operation since 1764 in Lichte (Wallendorf) in the Thuringian Highlands. Wallendorf is one of the oldest porcelain trademarks in Germany and the whole of Europe.

Beginnings 

In the 18th century the territory of Lichte (Wallendorf) was located in two different principalities with the Lichte river forming the border. On the west bank was Schwarzburg-Rudolstadt and on the east bank Saxe-Coburg-Saalfeld.

In 1761, almost 50 years after the invention of porcelain manufacturing by Ehrenfried Walter von Tschirnhaus and Johann Friedrich Böttger, Johan Wolfgang Hammann from Katzhütte applied to the house of Scharzburg-Rudolstadt for the concession of porcelain manufacturing. Unfortunately, only three days previously this concession had been granted to Heinrich Macheleid in Sitzendorf, so Hamman’s request had to be rejected. However, he did not give up his dream. One year later he was able to fire hard-paste porcelain in Katzhütte, and one year after that he purchased the Baron Hohental manor in Lichte on the Saxe-Coburg-Saalfeld bank of the river.

Finally the Duke of Saxe-Coburg granted Hammann his porcelain manufacturing concession, and in 1764, together with Gotthelf Greiner and his cousin Gottfried Greiner, he founded the porcelain manufacturing company in Lichte (Wallendorf). Consequently the trademark Wallendorf porcelain, one of the oldest porcelain trademarks in Europe, was established.

Early work

Originally, Wallendorf porcelain was manufactured using local raw materials. This was the main reason for unclean and toned porcelain. However, by 1780 Bohemian kaolin was being used, resulting in snow-white hard-paste porcelain. According to the expert Wilhelm Martius in 1793, "Wallendorf porcelain is now brilliant white, . . . beautifully" painted and so hard, that even sparks are emitted by friction on steel".

Until 1833 the company remained in the hands of Hammann’s family. The turbulent years after that were characterised by often changing ownership. Among famous names—indications of porcelain tradition and quality even today—can be found Hutschenreuther, Kämpfe, Sonntag, Heubach, Fraureuth, and Schaubach. The changes in ownership and the economic up and downs were reflected in changes intrademarks. In this time imitations of the Meissen porcelain trademark were noticed and were the subject of complaints to the Electoral Saxe-Coburg Land Authority. Today’s trademark of the letter W below a crown and the foundation year of 1764 was introduced 200 years after the foundation of Wallendorf porcelain.

Traditions and developments 
The typical character of Wallendorf porcelain has survived for almost two and a half centuries until today. In 1764 production started with handmade coffee, tea and chocolate services; in 1785 these were complemented by figurines. These areas are still the main focuses of production. Of course, the technology of raw material mixtures and firing procedures have changed. However, the particular detailed composition invented by Hammann has been improved and survived the centuries as a top secret releasable to insiders only. The typical handmade procedures, such as quality management by experts and hand painting, have remained almost unchanged.

Old Wallendorf art

Porcelain manufacturing today

Company structure

See also
Lichte, the municipality
Porcelain manufacturing companies in Europe

References

 Wilhelm Stieda: Die Anfänge der Porzellanfabrikation auf dem Thüringerwalde Jena 1902, S. 71 ff
 Wallendorfer Porzellan Manufaktur GmbH: Bodenmarkentafel, Bildarchiv
 Edwards, Howard GM: Nantgarw and Swansea Porcelains: An Analytical Perspective Springer 2018, p3

External links

 
 Website of the Thuringian porcelain road

Ceramics manufacturers of Germany
Companies based in Thuringia
Volkseigene Betriebe
German brands
German porcelain
Lichte
Companies established in 1764
1764 establishments in the Holy Roman Empire